Sulzbach is a town and a municipality in the district of Saarbrücken, in Saarland, Germany with a population of 16,215 (as of Dec 2015).

Following reforms of the regional government in 1974, Schnappach, previously part of St. Ingbert, was incorporated by Sulzbach.

Economy and Infrastructure 
Major employers include Knappschaftskrankenhaus Sulzbach, as well as HYDAC group.

Sulzbach (Saar) station is located on the Bingen (Rhein)–Saarbrücken railway.

References

Saarbrücken (district)